Dost Mohammad Beyk (also Romanized as Dūst Moḩammad Beyk and Dūst Moḩammad Beyg) is a village in Kalateh chenar Rural District, Now Khandan District, Dargaz County, Razavi Khorasan Province, Iran. At the 2006 census, its population was 244, in 74 families.

References 

Populated places in Dargaz County